Kresty is a rural locality (a village) in Soshnevskoye Rural Settlement, Ustyuzhensky District, Vologda Oblast, Russia. The population was 4 as of 2002.

Geography 

References 

Rural localities in Ustyuzhensky District